HMS Royal William was a 120-gun first rate ship of the line of the Royal Navy, launched on 2 April 1833 at Pembroke Dock having taken eight years to build. She was one of the largest ships ever built by the Royal Navy at that time, with a crew of 900 men. However, she was built during the long period of peace in Great Britain and never saw any meaningful service.

Service
Royal William was fitted with screw propulsion in 1860 but never put into seagoing state for operation. In 1885 she was lent to the Liverpool Roman Catholic Reformatory Society, who renamed her  to replace their first reformatory school ship of that name destroyed by arson in 1884. As the new Clarence, she was ultimately also destroyed by arson, on 26 July 1899 on the River Mersey near New Ferry on the Wirral Peninsula in England.

Commanders of Note

Captain John Kingcome 1854 to 1856

Trivia

The figurehead of Royal William (in its original state) was for many years placed beside the historic 1775 Mutton Cove "covered slip number 1" in Plymouth harbour. In the 1990s it was replaced by a fibreglass copy, the wooden original is now preserved in The Box, Plymouth.

The "Royal William" public house in Liverpool was named after the ship. The pub was demolished in 1998.

Notes

References

Lavery, Brian (2003) The Ship of the Line - Volume 1: The development of the battlefleet 1650-1850. Conway Maritime Press. .
Lyon, David and Winfield, Rif (2004) The Sail and Steam Navy List: All the Ships of the Royal Navy 1815-1889. Chatham Publishing, London. .

Ships of the line of the Royal Navy
Caledonia-class ships of the line
Ships built in Pembroke Dock
1833 ships
Ship fires
Maritime incidents in 1899
Shipwrecks of the River Mersey